Philip Ambrose Brady (10 June 1893 – 6 January 1995) was an Irish Fianna Fáil politician who served as a Teachta Dála (TD) for Dublin South-Central for 19 years.

He was elected to Dáil Éireann on his first attempt, at the 1951 general election. He was defeated at the 1954 general election, but he regained his seat at the 1957 general election, and held it at four subsequent elections until he stood down at the 1977 general election. His son Gerard Brady then succeeded him as a TD for the new Dublin Rathmines West constituency

He served as Lord Mayor of Dublin from 1959 to 1960.

See also
Families in the Oireachtas

References

 

1893 births
1995 deaths
Fianna Fáil TDs
Irish centenarians
Men centenarians
Members of the 14th Dáil
Members of the 16th Dáil
Members of the 17th Dáil
Members of the 18th Dáil
Members of the 19th Dáil
Members of the 20th Dáil
Lord Mayors of Dublin
Politicians from County Dublin
People from Portobello, Dublin